The precedence diagram method (PDM) is a tool for scheduling activities in a project plan. It is a method of constructing a project schedule network diagram that uses boxes, referred to as nodes, to represent activities and connects them with arrows that show the dependencies.  It is also called the activity-on-node (AON) method.
 Critical tasks, noncritical tasks, and slack time
 Shows the relationship of the tasks to each other
 Allows for what-if, worst-case, best-case and most likely scenario

Key elements include determining predecessors and defining attributes such as 
 early start date..
 late start date
 early finish date
 late finish date
 duration
 activity name
 WBS reference

Slack/Float: Determines the duration of activity delay that the project can tolerate before the project comes in late. The difference between the earliest and the latest start time. i.e. Slack = latest start date - earliest start day or Slack = latest finish time - earliest finish time.

Any activities which have a slack of 0, they are on the critical path.

Different Precedence diagram Methods
 Arrow diagramming method
 Project network
 Critical-path method
 Gantt chart
 Program evaluation and review technique

External links
 Precedence Diagram Method at Better Projects

Project management techniques
Schedule (project management)